"Booster Seat" is a song by Australian indie rock band Spacey Jane, released on 7 June 2020 as the sixth and final single to their debut studio album, Sunlight (2020). The song peaked at number eight on the ARIA charts, and polled at number two in the Triple J Hottest 100 of 2020. It has reached certified triple platinum status, having sold over 210,000 units.

At the 2021 ARIA Music Awards, "Booster Seat" won Song of the Year. It also won Best Single at the 2020 West Australian Music Industry Awards, and Independent Song of the Year at the AIR Awards of 2021. Further, it was shortlisted for Song of the Year at the APRA Music Awards of 2021.

Composition

Lyricism 
"Booster Seat" took over six months to write. Frontman Caleb Harper said "the way it was put together is kind of different to our other songs", admitting the song "has a lot of space and it's very long", and that it wasn't released as a promotional single because "it's quite slow, it's not a standard sort of single choice".

As explained by Harper, "Booster Seat" lyrically deals with "feeling like anxiety and depression are taking control away from you". Al Newstead of Triple J explained "it's a complex emotional metaphor made easy to grasp by the imagery" and the "song’s gorgeous refrain."

Production 
The song came about as Harper was "messing about with some open chords on the guitar, sliding gently between the 1st and the 4th of the key." Lead guitarist Ashton Hardman-Le Cornu then developed the riff and presented it to the producer, who originally rejected it.

Reception 
Australian rock band Ocean Alley called the song "a warm and nostalgic masterpiece with thoughtful storytelling and instrumentation to match." Newstead continued, praising "Booster Seat" as a "life-affirming song with a platinum-strength sing-along quality". Its chorus was listed among the best song lyrics of 2020, according to Triple J.

In the lead-up to the Triple J Hottest 100 of 2020, several bookmakers and music publications predicted "Booster Seat" would top the countdown. Josh Leeson of Northern Beaches Review wrote it was "the one presenting the best chance of securing the first Australian Hottest 100 winner since Ocean Alley's 'Confidence' in 2018." The song eventually polled at number two.

Harper cited the song's placement in the Hottest 100 was a key factor in the band's live performances gaining significantly more traction, reflecting "we went from playing 200 or 300 capacity rooms, to playing multiple 1,000 capacity rooms."

Live performances 
Spacey Jane played "Booster Seat" live at Fremantle Arts Centre on 31 December 2020, and released a video of the performance the following month. The band performed the song for Triple J's live music segment Like a Version on 29 January 2021. In August 2021, they released an acoustic version of the track in their Apple Music-exclusive Home Sessions EP.

Music video
The music video was directed by Matt Sav and released on 11 December 2020.

Charts

Weekly charts

Year-end charts

Certification

References

2020 songs
2021 singles
Spacey Jane songs
ARIA Award-winning songs
Songs written by Caleb Harper